Adil Bellaz (born June 4, 1981) is a Moroccan former swimmer, who specialized in freestyle events. Bellaz qualified for the men's 200 m freestyle at the 2004 Summer Olympics in Athens, by clearing a FINA B-standard entry time of 1:54.08 from the Vittel Cup in Mulhouse, France. He challenged seven other swimmers in heat two, including dual citizen Mihail Alexandrov of Bulgaria. He raced to sixth place in a time of 1:55.79, more than a second off his entry time. Bellaz failed to advance into the semifinals, as he placed fifty-third overall in the preliminaries.

References

External links 
 

1981 births
Living people
Olympic swimmers of Morocco
Swimmers at the 2004 Summer Olympics
Moroccan male freestyle swimmers
20th-century Moroccan people
21st-century Moroccan people